Arzhang Amirfazli is an Iranian actor, comedian, writer, director and also worked for several years in designing and making TV set decorations.

Due to nationwide protests related to the death of Mahsa Amini and the people in September2022 , arzhang amirfazli said goodbye to the world of acting in Iranian cinema and television by posting a post on Instagram.

Career 
Amirfazli graduated from the Graphic Collage. He is He started his career with theater since 1988, his father was actor, director and voice actor Hossein Amirfazli. His first appearance on Iranian national TV was back in 1993 with Mehran Modiri and Hamid Lolayi in sitcom known as Nowrooz 72 which was broadcast during nowrooz.

Filmography

TV series

Theatre

References

External links 
 
 

1970 births
Living people
Iranian comedians
Iranian male film actors
Iranian male stage actors
Iranian male television actors
20th-century Iranian male actors
21st-century Iranian male actors